Skeleton Lake is a recreational, freshwater lake in Alberta, Canada. The lake is  Northeast of the town of Boyle, Alberta, along Highway 63.

The lake's name is a translation of the Cree  which means "place of the skeletons." A Cree chief is buried along the eastern shore of the lake. The lake drains through a small creek in Bondiss eastwards towards Amisk Lake.

There are approximately 890 cottage and trailer sites around Skeleton Lake. There are 11 subdivisions surrounding the lake, which are part of the Athabasca County, containing approximately 300 lots. As well, the Summer Village of Mewatha Beach with approximately 220 properties, the Summer Village of Bondiss with approximately 195 lots and Shoreline Campground with approximately 170 sites are all located on the shores of Skeleton Lake. A public golf course is located in the Summer Village of Bondiss on the east side of the lake.

External links
Skeleton Lake Stewardship Association
Atlas of Alberta Lakes

Athabasca County
Skeleton Lake